Divine soul in kabbalah is the source of good inclination and Godly desires.

Divine soul may also refer to:

 Ātman (Hinduism), inner self or soul
 Ātman (Buddhism), the concept of self
 Jīva (Jainism), a philosophical term to identify the soul
 Divine soul, concept in Sufi cosmology

See also 
 Soul